SM UB-60 was a German Type UB III submarine or U-boat in the German Imperial Navy during World War I. She was commissioned into the Training Flotilla of the German Imperial Navy on 6 June 1917 as SM UB-60.

She operated as part of the Training Flotilla based in Kiel. UB-60 was surrendered to the Allies at Harwich on 26 November 1918 in accordance with the requirements of the Armistice with Germany. She was sold by the British Admiralty to George Cohen on 3 March 1919 for £1,850, but foundered in tow en-route from Chatham to Swansea for breaking-up on 12 June 1919.

Construction

She was built by AG Vulcan of Hamburg and following just under a year of construction, launched at Hamburg on 14 April 1917. UB-60 was commissioned later that same year under the command of Oblt.z.S. Peter Ernst Eiffe. Like all Type UB III submarines, UB-60 carried 10 torpedoes and was armed with a  deck gun. UB-60 had a displacement of  while surfaced and  when submerged. Her engines enabled her to travel at  when surfaced and  when submerged.

Notes

References

Bibliography 

 

German Type UB III submarines
World War I submarines of Germany
U-boats commissioned in 1917
1917 ships
Ships built in Hamburg